The 2004 House elections in Missouri occurred on November 2, 2004, to elect the members of the State of Missouri's delegation to the United States House of Representatives. Missouri had nine seats in the House, apportioned according to the 2000 United States Census.

These elections were held concurrently with the United States presidential election of 2004, United States Senate elections of 2004 (including one in Missouri), the United States House elections in other states, and various state and local elections.

The most notable race of the 2004 cycle in Missouri was the contest for the Third District seat held by outgoing Representative and former House Democratic floor leader Dick Gephardt.

Overview

Election results

References

 2004 United States House of Representatives elections

2004
Missouri
2004 Missouri elections